Thomas Mountains is a separate cluster of rocky mountains, about 5 nautical miles (9 km) long, standing 15 nautical miles (28 km) northeast of Mount Horne in Palmer Land. Discovered by the Ronne Antarctic Research Expedition (RARE), 1947–48, under Ronne, who named these mountains for noted author and radio commentator Lowell Thomas, a supporter of the expedition.

The highest peak in the cluster is Mount Boyles, standing at 1,485 metres (4,870 ft).

References

Mountain ranges of Palmer Land
Geography of the British Antarctic Territory